The Bulgaria national rugby league team represents Bulgaria in the sport of rugby league football, having made their international debut at the 2017 Balkans Cup against Greece and Serbia in October 2017.

Results

References

Rugby league
National rugby league teams
Rugby league in Bulgaria